Generation Kill is an American heavy metal band formed in 2008 in Congers, New York by Rob Dukes (ex-Exodus) After the inclusion of Jason Trenczer, Lou Lehman and Sam Inzerra, the band got to work on writing and recording the first album, Red, White and Blood. Due to creative differences, Inzerra left and Jim DeMaria joined. This lineup recorded their sophomore album, We're All Gonna Die, with producer Zuess.

With new drummer Robert Youells, the band released an album with former Run-DMC member Darryl "DMC" McDaniels in a project initially titled DMC Generation Kill; the project was later renamed Fragile Mortals. In 2022, the band released MKUltra, the follow up to We're All Gonna Die.

The name Generation Kill was given by Dukes after the book of the same name.

Band members

Current members 
 Rob Dukes – vocals (2008–present)
 Jason Velez – guitars (2011–present)
 Jason Trenczer – guitar (2008–present)
 Max Velez – bass (2017–present)
 Robert Youells – drums (2015–2017; 2019–present)

Former members 
 Jim DeMaria – drums (2010–2014)
 Sam Inzerra – drums (2008–2010)
 Louie "Lou" Lehman – guitar (2008–2011)
 Jason Trenczer – guitar (2008–2016)
 Rob Moschetti – bass (2008–2016)
 Craig Cefola – drums (2017–2019)

Discography 
 Red, White and Blood (2011)
 We're All Gonna Die (2013)
 MKUltra (2022)

As Fragile Mortals 
 The Dark Project (2017)

References

External links 
 Official website
 

American thrash metal musical groups
Season of Mist artists
Nuclear Blast artists